The Polish Air Defence Force (Polish: Wojska Obrony Powietrznej Kraju (WOPK) for Troops for Air Defence of the Territory) - was one of the four branches of the Polish People's Army in the years 1962–1990, along with the Polish Land Forces, Polish Air Force and the Navy.

The Air Defence Force was intended for the defence of the population, troops and economically and strategically important military and administrative-state facilities located on the territory of the country, against enemy air attack. Their organizational model was modeled on Soviet Army solutions, which resulted from their inclusion in the air defense system of the Warsaw Pact countries. OPK troops constituted an important element of the country's territorial defense forces, which also included units of land forces and the Navy.

The three Air Defence Corps were all established in 1957.

On July 1, 1990, the Air Defence Force and the Air Force merged into the Air Force and Air Defense Troops (Wojska Lotnicze i Obrony Powietrznej (WLiOP)). The unified armed service took over the 1st, 2nd and 3rd Air Defence Corps as well as the 4th Air Corps (4. Korpus Lotniczy, HQ in Poznań) established in the beginning of 1990 as a command of  the Air Force's combat units of equal status to the 3 air defence corps. The 1st Air Defence Corps was disestablished in 1998, and the 2nd and 3rd Corps in 2007. Currently, after another reorganization and name change, the tasks of these troops are performed by Air Force units.

Force structure in 1989 
Territorial Air Defence Troops Command (Dowództwo Wojsk Obrony Powietrznej Kraju), in Warsaw
directly subordinated
Central Command Post of the WOPK (Centralne Stanowisko Dowodzenia WOPK), in Warsaw
 WOPK Communications Node (Węzeł Łączności WOPK), in Warsaw
WOPK Supply Unit (Jednostka Zabezpieczenia WOPK), in Warsaw
4th Air Base (4 Baza Lotnicza), at Warsaw - Babice (alternatively known as Warsaw - Bemowo)
1st Regiment for Radioelectronic Intelligence "Capt. Władysław Pietrusiak" (1 Pułk Rozpoznania Radioelektronicznego im. kpt. Wł. Pietrusiaka (1 prrel)), in Ogrodzieniec near Grójec
1st Battalion for Radioelectronic Intelligence (1 Batalion Rozpoznania Radioelektronicznego), in Dłużyna Górna near Zgorzelec
 3rd Regiment for Radioelectronic Jamming (3 Pułk Zakłóceń Radioelektronicznych (3 pzrel)), in Lidzbark Warmiński
14th Battalion for Radioelectronic Intelligence (14 Batalion Rozpoznania Radioelektronicznego), in Słupsk
Higher Radiotechnical Officer School "Capt. Sylwester Bartosik" (Wyższa Oficerska Szkoła Radiotechniczna im. kpt. Sylwestra Bartosika), in Jelenia Góra
WOPK School for Training of Radiotechnical Specialists (Szkoła Specjalistów Wojsk Radiotechnicznych), in Chorzów
WOPK [missile air defence] Specialists Training Center "Wojciech Kętrzyński" (Centrum Szkolenia Specjalistów Wojsk OPK im. Wojciecha Kętrzyńskiego), in Bemowo Piskie
 1st Air Defence Corps, in Warsaw
Command Post of the 1st ADC (SD 1 KOPK), in Warsaw
42nd Liaison Air Squadron (42 el), in Warsaw Babice (Bemowo)
1st WOPK "Warsaw" Fighter Air Regiment "Brig. Gen. Stefan Pawlikowski" (1. Pułk Lotnictwa Myśliwskiego "Warszawa" im. gen. bryg. pil. Stefana Pawlikowskiego (1 plm OPK)) - MiG-29/UB, MiG-21M/PFM/U, in Mińsk Mazowiecki Air Base
10th  WOPK Fighter Air Regiment "People's Partizans of the Krakow Lands" (10. Pułk Lotnictwa Myśliwskiego OPK im. Ludowych Partyzantów Ziemi Krakowskiej (10 plm OPK)) - MiG-21PFM/M/MF/UM, in Łask Air Base
3rd WOPK [missile air defence] Łużycką Artillery Brigade ((3 BA OPK)), in Warsaw
83rd Air Defence Command Battalion (83. Dywizjon Dowodzenia Obrony Powietrznej), in Warsaw Citadel
inner Warsaw defensive ring, initially S-75 Dvina, later upgraded to S-75M Volkhov:
2nd Missile Air Defence Battalion (2. Dywizjon Rakietowy Obrony Powietrznej), near Czosnów
3rd Missile Air Defence Battalion (3. Dywizjon Rakietowy Obrony Powietrznej), between Nadarzyn and Otrębusy near Pruszków
4th Missile Air Defence Battalion (4. Dywizjon Rakietowy Obrony Powietrznej), in Baniocha near Góra Kalwaria
5th Missile Air Defence Battalion (5. Dywizjon Rakietowy Obrony Powietrznej), in Słupno near Radzymin
1st Technical Air Defence Battalion (1. Dywizjon Techniczny Obrony Powietrznej), in Książenice near Grodzisk Mazowiecki
outer Warsaw defensive ring S-75M Volkhov battalions:
6th Missile Air Defence Battalion (6. Dywizjon Rakietowy Obrony Powietrznej), at Chrcynno airfield, Nasielsk near Nowy Dwór Mazowiecki
7th Missile Air Defence Battalion (7. Dywizjon Rakietowy Obrony Powietrznej), in Pustelnik near Sulejówek
8th Missile Air Defence Battalion (8. Dywizjon Rakietowy Obrony Powietrznej), in Lesznowola near Grójec
9th Missile Air Defence Battalion (9. Dywizjon Rakietowy Obrony Powietrznej), in Teresin near Sochaczew
10th Technical Air Defence Battalion (10. Dywizjon Techniczny Obrony Powietrznej), in Struga near Marki
S-125M Neva battalions:
60th Missile Air Defence Battalion (60. Dywizjon Rakietowy Obrony Powietrznej), in Chotomów near Olszewnica Stara
61st Missile Air Defence Battalion (61. Dywizjon Rakietowy Obrony Powietrznej), in Małocice near Czosnów
62nd Missile Air Defence Battalion (62. Dywizjon Rakietowy Obrony Powietrznej), between Borzęcin Duży and Mariew near Stare Babice
63rd Missile Air Defence Battalion (63. Dywizjon Rakietowy Obrony Powietrznej), between Nadarzyn and Rusiec near Pruszków
1st WOPK Radiotechnical Brigade (1. Brygada Radiotechniczna), in Warsaw-Babice
3rd Sandomierski Radiotechnical Battalion (3. Sandomierski Batalion Radiotechniczny), in Sandomierz
4th Radiotechnical Battalion (4. Batalion Radiotechniczny), in Radiowo
7th Łaski Radiotechnical Battalion (7. Łaski Batalion Radiotechniczny), in Wiewiórczyn
8th Szczycieński Radiotechnical Battalion (8. Szczycieński Batalion Radiotechniczny), in Lipowiec
 2nd Air Defence Corps, in Bydgoszcz
 Command Post of the 1st ADC (SD 1 KOPK), in Bydgoszcz
43rd Liaison Air Squadron (43 el), in Bydgoszcz
26th  WOPK Fighter Air Regiment ((26 plm OPK)), in Zegrze Pomorskie Air Base (disbanded in 1989)
28th  WOPK Słupski Fighter Air Regiment (28. Słupski Pułk Lotnictwa Myśliwskiego (28 plm OPK)) - MiG-23MF/UB, in Słupsk
34th  WOPK Fighter Air Regiment "Heroes of Kępa Oksywska" (34 Pułk Lotnictwa Myśliwskiego OPK im. Bohaterów Kępy Oksywskiej (34 plm OPK)) - MiG-21bis/UM, Gdynia-Babie Doły Air Base
19th WOPK Target-Towing Air Squadron (19 LEH), in Słupsk - Yak-40
4th WOPK [missile air defence] Artillery Brigade "Defenders of the Coast" (4 Brygada Artylerii Obrony Powietrznej Kraju im. Obrońców Wybrzeża (4 BA OPK)), in Gdynia
84th Air Defence Command Battalion (84. Dywizjon Dowodzenia Obrony Powietrznej), in Gdynia-Grabówek
Gdynia and Gdańsk defensive ring missile battalions armed with S-75M Volkhov:
21st Missile Air Defence Battalion (21. Dywizjon Rakietowy Obrony Powietrznej), in Puck
22nd Missile Air Defence Battalion (22. Dywizjon Rakietowy Obrony Powietrznej), in Hel on Hel Peninsula
23rd Missile Air Defence Battalion (23. Dywizjon Rakietowy Obrony Powietrznej), in Wyspa Sobieszewska near Gdańsk
24th Missile Air Defence Battalion (24. Dywizjon Rakietowy Obrony Powietrznej), in Babi Dół near Kartuz
25th Missile Air Defence Battalion (25. Dywizjon Rakietowy Obrony Powietrznej), in Dąbrówka near Luzino
26th Technical Air Defence Battalion (26. Dywizjon Techniczny Obrony Powietrznej), in Bieszkowice near Wejherowo
defensive line along the Baltic coast:
S-75M Wołchow:
44th Missile Air Defence Battalion (44. Dywizjon Rakietowy Obrony Powietrznej), in Ustka
45th Missile Air Defence Battalion (45. Dywizjon Rakietowy Obrony Powietrznej), in Smołdzinie
46th Missile Air Defence Battalion (46. Dywizjon Rakietowy Obrony Powietrznej), in Choczewo near Wejherowo
S-125M Neva:
64th Missile Air Defence Battalion (64. Dywizjon Rakietowy Obrony Powietrznej), in Hel Bór on the Hel Peninsula
65th Missile Air Defence Battalion (65. Dywizjon Rakietowy Obrony Powietrznej), in Rozewie near Władysławowo
68th Missile Air Defence Battalion (68. Dywizjon Rakietowy Obrony Powietrznej), in Łeba near Lębork
69th Missile Air Defence Battalion (69. Dywizjon Rakietowy Obrony Powietrznej), in Rowy near Ustka
26th WOPK [missile air defence] Artillery Brigade (26 BA OPK), in Gryfice
82nd Air Defence Command Battalion (82. Dywizjon Dowodzenia Obrony Powietrznej), in Gryfice
Szczecin defensive ring missile battalions armed with S-75M Volkhov:
36th Missile Air Defence Battalion (36. Dywizjon Rakietowy Obrony Powietrznej), in Dobra (Szczecińska) near Police
37th Missile Air Defence Battalion (37. Dywizjon Rakietowy Obrony Powietrznej), in Glicko near Nowogard
38th Missile Air Defence Battalion (38. Dywizjon Rakietowy Obrony Powietrznej), in Bielkowo near Stargard Szczeciński
39th Missile Air Defence Battalion (39. Dywizjon Rakietowy Obrony Powietrznej), in Czarnówko near Gryfino
defensive line along the Baltic coast:
missile battalions armed with S-75M Volkhov:
40th Missile Air Defence Battalion (40. Dywizjon Rakietowy Obrony Powietrznej), in Kołczewo
42nd Missile Air Defence Battalion (42. Dywizjon Rakietowy Obrony Powietrznej), in Ustronie Morskie
43rd Missile Air Defence Battalion (43. Dywizjon Rakietowy Obrony Powietrznej), in Dąbki near Darłowo Naval Air Base
missile battalions armed with S-125M Neva:
41st Missile Air Defence Battalion (41. Dywizjon Rakietowy Obrony Powietrznej), in Mrzeżyno
66th Missile Air Defence Battalion (66. Dywizjon Rakietowy Obrony Powietrznej), in Wicko Morskie near Słupsk Air Base
67th Missile Air Defence Battalion (67. Dywizjon Rakietowy Obrony Powietrznej), in Unieście near Koszalin
70th Missile Air Defence Battalion (70. Dywizjon Rakietowy Obrony Powietrznej), in Łunowo near Świnoujście
71st Missile Air Defence Battalion (71. Dywizjon Rakietowy Obrony Powietrznej), in Pobierowo near Gryfice
78th WOPK 78th Missile Air Defence Regiment (78. Pułk Rakietowy Obrony Powietrznej OPK), in Mrzeżyno - S-200 missile system (subordinated to 26th Brigade)
Command Battalion (dywizjon dowodzenia)
1st Firing Battalion (1. dywizjon ogniowy)
2nd Firing Battalion (2. dywizjon ogniowy)
Technical Battalion (dywizjon techniczny)
2nd WOPK Radiotechnical Brigade (2. Brygada Radiotechniczna), in Bydgoszcz
21st Radiotechnical Battalion (21. Battalion Radiotechniczny), in Władysławowo
22nd Radiotechnical Battalion (22. Battalion Radiotechniczny), in Chojnice
23rd Radiotechnical Battalion (23. Battalion Radiotechniczny), in Słupsk
27th Radiotechnical Battalion (27. Battalion Radiotechniczny), in Witkowo Pyrzyckie
28th Radiotechnical Battalion (28. Battalion Radiotechniczny), in Gryfice
11th Radiotechnical Company (11. Kompnia Radiotechniczna), in Chruściel
3rd Air Defence Corps, in Wrocław
Command Post of the 1st ADC (SD 1 KOPK), in Wrocław
44th Liaison Air Squadron (44 el), in Wrocław - Strachowice Air Base
11th  WOPK Brandenburski Fighter Air Regiment "Lower Silesian Settlers" (11 Brandenburski Pułk Lotnictwa Myśliwskiego OPK im. Osadników Ziemi Dolnośląskiej (11 plm OPK)) - MiG-21MF/UM, in Wrocław - Strachowice Air Base
39th  WOPK Fighter Air Regiment (39 plm OPK), in Mierzęcice (disbanded in 1987)
62nd  WOPK Fighter Air Regiment "Greater Poland Revolutionaries" (62 Pułk Lotnictwa Myśliwskiego OPK im. Powstańców Wielkopolskich (62 plm OPK)) - MiG-21 PFM/MF/US, in Poznań - Krzesiny Air Base
1st WOPK [missile air defence] Artillery Brigade "Silesian Revolutionaries" (1 Brygadę Artylerii Obrony Powietrznej Kraju im. Powstańców Śląskich (1 BA OPK)), in Bytom
81st Air Defence Command Battalion (81. Dywizjon Dowodzenia Obrony Powietrznej), in Bytom
group located northwest of Gliwice (armed with S-75M Volkhov):
11th Missile Air Defence Battalion (11. Dywizjon Rakietowy Obrony Powietrznej), in Kuźnia Raciborska (disbanded in 1990)
12th Missile Air Defence Battalion (12. Dywizjon Rakietowy Obrony Powietrznej), in Zimna Wódka near Strzelce Opolskie
13th Missile Air Defence Battalion (13. Dywizjon Rakietowy Obrony Powietrznej), in Lubliniec
14th Missile Air Defence Battalion (14. Dywizjon Rakietowy Obrony Powietrznej), in Woźniki Śląskie
19th Technical Battalion (19. Dywizjon Techniczny Obrony Powietrznej), in Toszek near Gliwice
group located southeast of Katowice (armed with S-75M Volkhov):
15th Missile Air Defence Battalion (15. Dywizjon Rakietowy Obrony Powietrznej), in Ciągowice near Zawiercie
16th Missile Air Defence Battalion (16. Dywizjon Rakietowy Obrony Powietrznej), in Bukowno (disbanded in 1989)
17th Missile Air Defence Battalion (17. Dywizjon Rakietowy Obrony Powietrznej), in Libiąż lub Chełmek near Oświęcim
18th Missile Air Defence Battalion (18. Dywizjon Rakietowy Obrony Powietrznej), in Kobiór near Pszczyna (disbanded in 1989)
20th Technical Battalion (20. Dywizjon Techniczny Obrony Powietrznej), in Hutki near Olkusz
group of S-125M Neva battalions located southwest of Gliwice and Katowice:
72nd Missile Air Defence Battalion (72. Dywizjon Rakietowy Obrony Powietrznej), in Lędziny near Oświęcim
73rd Missile Air Defence Battalion (73. Dywizjon Rakietowy Obrony Powietrznej), in Bujaków near Oświęcim
74th Missile Air Defence Battalion (74. Dywizjon Rakietowy Obrony Powietrznej), in Ostropa near Gliwice
75th Missile Air Defence Battalion (75. Dywizjon Rakietowy Obrony Powietrznej), in Przezchlebie near Gliwice
79th WOPK Separate Missile Air Defence Regiment (79. samodzielny Pułk Rakietowy Obrony Powietrznej OPK), in Poznań
S-75M Volkhov battalions:
28th Missile Air Defence Battalion (28. Dywizjon Rakietowy Obrony Powietrznej), in Trzcielin near Stęszew
29th Missile Air Defence Battalion (29. Dywizjon Rakietowy Obrony Powietrznej), in Nieczajna near Oborniki
30th Missile Air Defence Battalion (30. Dywizjon Rakietowy Obrony Powietrznej), in Trzaskowo near Murowana Goślina
31st Kórnicki Missile Air Defence Battalion (31. Kórnicki Dywizjon Rakietowy Obrony Powietrznej), in Czołowo near Kórnik
32nd Technical Battalion (32. Dywizjon Techniczny), in Biedrusko near Poznań
S-125(M) Neva battalions:
76th Missile Air Defence Battalion (76. Dywizjon Rakietowy Obrony Powietrznej), in Chomęcice
77th Missile Air Defence Battalion (77. Dywizjon Rakietowy Obrony Powietrznej), in Złotkowo
3rd WOPK Radiotechnical Brigade (3. Brygada Radiotechniczna), in Wrocław
31st Radiotechnical Battalion (31. Batalion Radiotechniczny), in Poznań-Babki
32nd Radiotechnical Battalion (32. Batalion Radiotechniczny), in Szczawno
33rd Radiotechnical Battalion (33. Batalion Radiotechniczny), in Radzionków
35th Radiotechnical Battalion (35. Batalion Radiotechniczny), in Pietrzykowice
36th Radiotechnical Battalion (36. Batalion Radiotechniczny), in Kraków-Węgrzce

References 

 
 Paweł Piotrowski, System obrony powietrznej Polski w latach 1959-1990, część I, Lotnictwo Wojskowe. Magazyn Miłośników Lotnictwa Wojskowego Nr 2 (23), MAGNUM X Sp. z o.o., marzec-kwiecień 2002, ISSN 1505-1196, s. 32–36.
 Paweł Piotrowski, System obrony powietrznej Polski w latach 1959-1990, część II, Lotnictwo Wojskowe. Magazyn Miłośników Lotnictwa Wojskowego Nr 3 (24), MAGNUM X Sp. z o.o., maj-czerwiec 2002, ISSN 1505-1196, s. 27–31.
 Paweł Piotrowski, System obrony powietrznej Polski w latach 1959-1990, część III, Lotnictwo Wojskowe. Magazyn Miłośników Lotnictwa Wojskowego Nr 4 (25), MAGNUM X Sp. z o.o., lipiec-sierpień 2002, ISSN 1505-1196, s. 33–37.
 
 Marian Bondzior, Jak zdobywałem swój kawałek nieba, Wydawnictwa WLOP, Warszawa 2002

Military of Poland
Air defence forces
Military units and formations disestablished in 1990